Big Brother 2005, also known as Big Brother 6, was the sixth series of the British reality television series Big Brother. The show followed sixteen contestants, known as housemates, who were isolated from the outside world for an extended period of time in a custom built House. Each week, one or more of the housemates were evicted by a public vote. The last remaining housemate, Anthony Hutton, was declared the winner, winning a cash prize of £50,000. Runner-up Eugene Sully also won the same amount during a task, two days before the final.

The series launched on Channel 4 on 27 May 2005 and ended on 12 August 2005, lasting 78 days – the fifth longest British edition of Big Brother to date. Davina McCall returned as presenter for her sixth consecutive year. Thirteen housemates entered on launch night, with an additional three being introduced in the fourth week. The series was watched by an average of 4.6 million viewers, the fourth highest viewed series of the show to date (joint with Big Brother 4).

Big Brother 6 was the subject of viewer complaints and press attention regarding a variety of controversial scenes.

Production

Announcement and promotion

The sixth series of Big Brother was first confirmed in 2002, when Channel 4 made a deal with franchise owner Endemol to keep the show on the air until at least 2005. In early 2005, Channel 4 confirmed that Big Brother would return for its sixth series in the summer of that year. After speculation that the "evil" theme from the previous series would not return, executive producer Sharon Powers told the press that Big Brother would "continue to be evil this year".

For the fifth year in a row, Channel 4 commissioned graphic designer Daniel Eatock to create the "Big Brother eye". The eye was a sliced mirror of alternating black and blue strips, in reality, two eyes on top of each other. It was publicly revealed on 30 April 2005. Promotional material included an art installation of the eye at the Truman Brewery in East London, constructed out of over 1000 cardboard boxes (some of which contained televisions).

On 9 May 2005, Channel 4 began airing countdown bumpers, eighteen days before the launch.

Presenters and programming
Davina McCall, who had presented the show since its inception in 2000 was confirmed to return to the sixth series as presenter of the live shows, such as launch night, weekly evictions, the finale and other special live shows. Nightly highlights were broadcast on Channel 4, narrated by Marcus Bentley. Dermot O'Leary returned as presenter of Big Brother's Little Brother weekdays on Channel 4 and Sunday lunchtime. On E4, live coverage once again dominated its daily and nightly schedule, with additional live streaming online. Nominations Uncut and Diary Room Uncut also returned. Big Brother's EFourum – introduced in the previous year – was revamped and its name changed to Big Brother's Big Mouth, with Russell Brand continuing as presenter of that show. It was also announced that E4 would be available on the Freeview platform from May 2005, to coincide with the beginning of the series.

Housemates and prize
For the second year, open auditions were used to select housemates; these took place between 5 February and 6 March 2005. The broadcaster told the press that there would be thirteen housemates with a theme of "unlucky thirteen," inspired by triskaidekaphobia.

The winner stood to earn £100,000, however two days before the final, housemate Eugene was given a dilemma, to take half of the prize money from the grand prize by Big Brother. He was unaware that refusing the money would have doubled the prize fund to £200,000. He took the money, which meant that the eventual winner Anthony only won £50,000 (the same as Eugene).

The House

The House for Big Brother 2005 was a radical change from the oppressive and angled House from the previous year. House designer Patrick Watson described the design as "aspirational and yet not wildly practical." Although the House was still quite small, light pale colours and high camera angles gave the viewer the impression that the House is larger than it actually is. Watson also revealed that he accomplished this by extensively utilising mirrors for an airier and cooler atmosphere. Channel 4 described the House as the boldest one at the time and Watson stated it to be complementary to "iPod neutrality."

Pictures of the House were released on 24 May 2005, revealing the outdoor shower and pool. There was a row of three outdoor showers that replace the need for a complete bathroom; two other toilets were contained indoors, one in the living room and one in the bedroom. The tiled floor lead onto the wooden deck of the pool, this year a circular pool positioned in a corner of the garden. The other side of the showers lead towards the slightly elevated glass-box lounge that originally had multi-levelled green couches but were eventually replaced with low orange ones.

More pictures were released to the press later in the day. These depicted the exterior of the Diary Room: a chaotic web of sliced and angled mirrors giving housemates a distorted reflection of the rest of the House. These pictures also showed that the House was composed of one main, column-free, airy room with cream-coloured carpeting on which the dining table rested and an elevated kitchen containing a row of yellow cabinets. For the first time, an American-style refrigerator was utilised, giving the housemates more space for food and located next to the store-room. However, the glass wall that allowed housemates to view the bedroom from the living area was disguised as a mirror to ensure that viewers would not be able to count how many housemates would be in the House. Finally, only a few days before launch night, pictures of a loft in the garden leaked to the press. On Day 1, it was shown that it was painted green rather than the pink shown in the pictures. It was also revealed that the bedroom would contain a "heat-seeking" thermal camera.

The Secret Garden 
On the opposite side of the main Diary Room entrance was another door, which lead to the "Secret Garden". The Secret Garden was an indoor room decorated like a jungle, and contained a fridge, basic cooking utensils and crockery, a hatch, three beds, a decorative stag head (which was revealed to be able to speak), a television screen and an adjoining toilet. The Garden also contained a telephone that Big Brother used to communicate quietly with the secret housemates, and a "Quiet" sign that illuminated whenever one of the main housemates occupied the Diary Room.

It was first used on Day 29, when housemates Kinga Karolczak, Orlaith McAllister and Eugene Sully secretly entered the House, minutes after Roberto Conte was evicted. For several days, the three housemates had to live in the Secret Garden, with only Makosi knowing their existence. The only clothing initially supplied to the three secret housemates was fig-leaf underwear. With Makosi's help, they had to steal clothes and food from the main Big Brother House when the other housemates were asleep, and to make sure that the other housemates did not find out about them. The secret housemates stayed in the Secret Garden until Day 32, when Orlaith and Eugene were selected by Makosi to enter the main House and become true housemates.

Housemates 

13 housemates entered the House on Day 1. In week 5, three other housemates entered the Secret Garden. Makosi then chose two of them to enter the main House, Orlaith and Eugene. When Orlaith voluntarily left weeks later, Kinga who was the third housemate from the Secret Garden re-entered the House.

Notes

Weekly summary

Nominations table

Notes 

: Makosi was told on Day 1 that the housemates who received the most nominations that week would be immune from the first eviction. She was therefore given the secret mission of trying to get the most nominations that week. She succeeded in her task, receiving the most nominations along with Roberto and Sam, who were now immune. She then had to nominate two housemates to face eviction, as all the other housemates' nominations became voided. She nominated Mary and Craig.
: As punishment for Vanessa discussing nominations, all housemates automatically faced eviction and their nominations were voided. Had this not happened, Derek and Sam would have faced the public vote.
: As punishment for discussing nominations, Craig, Derek and Roberto were banned from nominating. 
: As punishment for discussing nominations, Anthony and Maxwell were banned from nominating. After Roberto's eviction, three new housemates entered the secret garden, where they secretly lived alongside the original housemates. As Makosi was on a secret mission, she had to evict one person from the secret garden, the other two entered the house. Makosi chose to evict Kinga, and Eugene and Orlaith entered the house.
: Big Brother set the housemates a task, telling them Big Brother would lie to them twice. Big Brother told the housemates that the week's nominations were optional. This was the first lie. As always, nominations were compulsory; those that did not nominate would face the public vote. Only Anthony, Craig and Kemal nominated – saving them from the public vote. Big Brother then told the second lie by announcing that the housemates up for eviction were Anthony, Craig and Kemal, when in fact they were the only housemates not up. On eviction night, Makosi and Vanessa were announced to have received the most votes and the remaining housemates had to decide whom to evict. Vanessa was evicted with six votes, with only Kemal voting to evict Makosi.
: Instead of nominating those that they wanted to evict, the housemates had to nominate those who they wanted to stay in the house, with the two or more housemates with the least nominations facing the public vote.
: After Orlaith walked, Kinga entered the house. She was instantly set a secret mission in which she needed to get at least one person not to nominate her. If one person failed to nominate her, she would gain immunity and would definitely appear in the final week. She passed her task as none of the housemates nominated her.
: There were no nominations in the final week. There was also a mid-week eviction. The housemate who had received the fewest votes from the public (to win) by Wednesday night would finish in fifth place, leaving four housemates in the final. This housemate was Craig, leaving Anthony, Eugene, Kinga, and Makosi in the final four.

Reception
Big Brother 6 received mixed reviews from professional critics. While one critic called the show "dull and unlikeable", another called it "refreshing viewing". Charlie Brooker called the series "foul and unsettling",and wrote an article criticising most of the housemates individually.

Eleven years after the conclusion of Big Brother 6, columnist Rupert Hawksley opined that the series potentially marked "the moment when Big Brother began its ongoing gurgle in the gutter".

Viewership
These viewing figures are taken from BARB.

Criticism and controversy
Throughout the sixth series, Big Brother was subject to numerous complaints from the viewing public. While some were generalised concerns about the welfare of the housemates, others referred to specific incidents, including but not limited to: Maxwell's claim to have put scabs from his feet into Science's food; scenes filmed in the pool that led some viewers, and housemates, to believe that Anthony and Makosi had sex; Craig allegedly making "unwelcome advances" towards Anthony; Kinga allegedly masturbating with a wine bottle; hostility directed towards Makosi by the live crowd and, allegedly, Davina McCall during the Live Final; and Channel 4 breaking the Advertising Standards Authority's code. There was also commentary by some viewers, and by some housemates themselves, on what appeared to be a clear racial divide between groups that formed in the House. In one group were Anthony, Craig, Maxwell, and Saskia (all of whom are white British). In the other were Derek (Jamaican descent), Kemal (Turkish Cypriot), Makosi (Zimbabwean), Science (black) and Vanessa (black).

Media regulator Ofcom, which received over 900 complaints about the series, opined in response that Big Brother "offers viewers, unpalatable though it may be, a window on what some complainants believed to be the unacceptable attitudes of some members of society". Although Ofcom did not uphold any of the viewers' complaints about the series as a whole, they were particularly critical of the pool scenes and the scene involving Kinga and the wine bottle, stating that such scenes "operated at the limits of acceptability in terms of potential harm and/or offence for a programme of this nature, broadcast on this channel and at this time".

Legacy
In 2008, Charlie Brooker created and wrote the horror mini-series Dead Set, set during a fictional series of Big Brother. It featured several former Big Brother contestants in cameo roles, including Eugene Sully, Kinga Karolczak, Makosi Musambasi and Saskia Howard-Clarke from Big Brother 6.

Housemates Makosi and Craig returned to Big Brother in 2009 as part of a retrospective week of that series, involving tasks from all previous series of Big Brother. They competed against Siavash Sabbaghpour in a recreation of the sixth series' Box task, where housemates had to remain in a cardboard box for the longest period of time.

In 2010, Makosi was a contestant in the show's final series, entitled Ultimate Big Brother, which featured memorable housemates from the first 11 series of Big Brother and its celebrity spin-off. She entered on Day 1 and became the second Ultimate housemate to be evicted on Day 11. Anthony also returned as a guest to have a picnic date with Makosi.

The first three seasons of the Serbian Big Brother series, Veliki brat, used the Big Brother eye logo and the opening titles from this series.

References

Further reading

External links 
 

2005 British television seasons
 6